Sir Edward Guildford (alternative spelling Guilford; c. 1474 – 1534) was an English courtier and Lord Warden of the Cinque Ports and Marshal of Calais in 1519. Upon his father's death in 1506, he inherited his father's position as Master of the Armoury for life. He was knighted on 25 September 1513.

Family
Edward Guildford was born at Offington in the parish of Broadwater (now part of Worthing), the son of Sir Richard Guildford and Anne Pympe.

Guildford married firstly, before 1496, Eleanor West, daughter of Thomas West, 8th Baron De La Warr (d. 11 October 1525), by whom he had a son, Richard, and a daughter, Jane, who married John Dudley, 1st Duke of Northumberland, with whom she had 13 children. His second wife was Joan, daughter of Stephen Pitlesden, by whom he had no issue.

His son Richard having predeceased him, Edward Guildford caused considerable strife with the family legacy when his daughter Jane inherited Haldon Manor rather than his nephew, John Guildford, Member of Parliament for Gatton, who was (arguably) instead intended to inherit with no nearer male heir.

Notes

References

1470s births
1534 deaths
Lords Warden of the Cinque Ports
People from Broadwater, West Sussex
15th-century English people
16th-century English people
English knights